Joan Noguera Artero (born 5 December 1991) is a Spanish professional footballer who plays for UE Sant Andreu as a central defender.

Club career
Born in Bagà, Barcelona, Catalonia, Noguera began playing football with local team CCR Baganès, followed by spells with UE Avià and CE Puig-reig. He made his senior debuts with lowly UE Avià in the 2006–07 campaign, but later moved to neighbouring UDA Gramenet, being assigned to the Juvenil squad. Noguera was promoted to the reserves in the 2010 summer, and a year later joined CF Gavà, also in the same region.

On 27 June 2013, Noguera signed with CE Sabadell FC, being assigned to the B-team. He made his first-team debut on 18 August, coming on as a late substitute in a 4–0 home victory against RCD Mallorca. In July 2015, he moved to UE Sant Andreu.

References

External links

1991 births
Living people
Spanish footballers
Footballers from Catalonia
Association football defenders
Segunda División players
Tercera División players
UDA Gramenet footballers
CF Gavà players
CE Sabadell FC footballers
UE Sant Andreu footballers
CE Sabadell FC B players